Long-distance racing or long-distance events may refer to:

Long-distance running
Long-distance swimming
Long track speed skating

See also
Endurance race (disambiguation)
Race stage
Racing
Rallying